Pascal Ohsé, also known by his stage name Soel, is a French jazz trumpeter. He is well known for his contributions to St Germain albums Boulevard and Tourist. In 2003 he released his studio album titled Memento, which peaked at #63 in Belgium, at #107 in France, and at #16 on the UK Jazz & Blues Albums.

Discography
Studio albums
 Memento (2003)
 Singles
 "Le Vicomte" (2003)
 Contributions
 1995 – Boulevard
 1999 – From Detroit to St Germain (on "Soul Salsa Soul")
 2000 – Tourist

References

External links
 Pascal Ohsé at Discogs

Living people
French jazz trumpeters
Male trumpeters
Warner Records artists
Year of birth missing (living people)
21st-century trumpeters
21st-century French male musicians
French male jazz musicians